Biden v. Nebraska (Docket 22–506) is a pending United States Supreme Court case related to the forgiveness of federal student loans by the Biden administration in 2022.

Background 

While campaigning for president in 2020, Joe Biden promised to cancel up to $10,000 of federal student loan debt per borrower. After being elected president, Biden called for the 117th U.S. Congress to pass a bill to facilitate $10,000 in student loan forgiveness. In August 2022, Biden announced that he would use executive action to forgive $10,000 in student loans for borrowers earning less than $125,000 individually and $250,000 as married couples, including an additional $10,000 for Pell Grant recipients. The Biden administration invoked the HEROES Act as the basis for his executive authority to forgive loans. In particular, the administration utilized language that states that the U.S. Secretary of Education has the authority to "waive or modify any statutory or regulatory provision applicable to the student financial assistance programs under Title IV" of the Higher Education Act of 1965 to ensure that "affected individuals" are not placed in a worse position financially in relation to that financial assistance. Affected individuals include, among others, those who "reside or are employed in an area declared a disaster area in connection with a national emergency" and those who "suffered direct economic hardship as a result of a war, military operation, or national emergency." 

On September 29, 2022, Nebraska, Missouri, Arkansas, Iowa, Kansas and South Carolina filed a lawsuit in the Eastern Missouri U.S. District Court challenging the forgiveness program, asserting that it violated the separation of powers and the Administrative Procedure Act. The states asserted they had standing because the American Rescue Plan Act of 2021 bars them from taxing loans that are discharged for 3 years. Missouri in particular also asserted that it had standing because the Higher Education Loan Authority of the State of Missouri (MOHELA) is a public entity that would lose revenue from student loan forgiveness and become less able to fund Missouri's student financial aid program. On October 20, 2022, district judge Henry Autrey dismissed the suit, holding that the states lacked standing to sue. The states appealed, and on November 14, 2022, the U.S. 8th Circuit Court of Appeals granted an injunction pending appeal.

Separately, on October 10, 2022, two student loan borrowers who did not qualify for the proposed debt forgiveness filed a lawsuit in the Northern Texas U.S. District Court, seeking to vacate the student loan forgiveness program. The borrowers asserted they had standing due to their inability to voice their disagreement with the program through a formal notice-and-comment rule making process required by the Administrative Procedure Act. On November 10, 2022, district judge Mark Pittman issued an order to strike down the student loan forgiveness program. On November 30, 2022, the U.S. 5th Circuit Court of Appeals declined to issue a hold on the order in response to an appeal from the U.S. Department of Education.

Supreme Court 

After the 8th Circuit granted an injunction pending appeal, the federal government sought to vacate the stay at the Supreme Court on November 18, 2022. On December 1, 2022, the court deferred resolution of the application, granted certiorari before judgment and set the case for argument in the February 2023 sitting. On December 2, 2022, the Biden administration requested that the court either hear the government's appeal from Pittman's order alongside the Nebraska case or issue a hold on his order. On December 12, the Supreme Court agreed to hear arguments in the second case, Department of Education v. Brown, jointly with Biden v. Nebraska. On January 4, 2023, the Justice and Education Departments filed a brief with the Court that argued that the plaintiffs failed to demonstrate legal injury from the proposal and thereby lacked standing under Article III, and that denied the claims made by the plaintiffs that the administration was overstepping its statutory authority in promulgating the proposal under the HEROES Act. 

Oral arguments for both Department of Education v. Brown, jointly with Biden v. Nebraska were held on February 28, 2023. Many journalists and legal commentators stated that based on oral arguments, the Court seemed likely to overturn the Biden debt relief program.

References

External links 
 

2023 in United States case law
United States Supreme Court cases
United States Supreme Court cases of the Roberts Court
United States Constitution Article One case law
United States education case law
Higher education case law
United States standing case law